Kord Kandi (also Romanized as Kord Kandī and Kordkandī) is a village in Hulasu Rural District, in the Central District of Shahin Dezh County, West Azerbaijan Province, Iran. At the 2006 census, its population was 588, in 103 families.

References 

Populated places in Shahin Dezh County